She Thought It Was Him (Swedish: Hon trodde det var han) is a 1943 Swedish comedy crime film directed by Per-Axel Branner and starring Edvin Adolphson, Anne-Margrethe Björlin and Naemi Briese. It was shot at the Centrumateljéerna Studios in Stockholm. The film's sets wered designed by the art director Bertil Duroj.

Synopsis
The publisher of a famous author pressure him to write in a more popular genre such as a crime. When he returns to his apartment he discovers a burglar with an uncanny likeness to himself. They agree to switch places to that the author can more accurately study crime at first end.

Cast
 Edvin Adolphson as	Mark Storm / Kurret
 Anne-Margrethe Björlin as 	Elsa
 Naemi Briese as 	Carmen
 Åke Claesson as 	Publisher
 Marianne Löfgren as 	Secretary
 Carl Hagman as 	Major Staalhammar
 Carl-Gunnar Wingård as 	Engineer
 Hilding Gavle as 	Professor
 Sture Baude as 	'Farfar'
 Ragnar Widestedt as 	Hotel manager
 Agda Helin as 	Major's wife
 Carl Deurell as 	Bengtsson
 David Erikson as Hotel receptionist
 Tom Walter as 	'Fimpen'
 Harry Ahlin as 	'Smockan'
 John Melin as 'Bomben'
 Siegfried Fischer as 	'Tjacket'
 Wiktor Andersson as 'Snoken'
 John Norrman as 	Svängbulten
 Artur Cederborgh as 	'Kisen'
 John Starck as 	'Dansken'
 Wilma Malmlöf as 	Hulda
 John Elfström as 	Policeman 
 Margareta Fahlén as 	Switchboard operator

References

Bibliography 
 Tapper, Michael. Swedish Cops: From Sjöwall and Wahlöö to Stieg Larsson. Intellect Books, 2014.
 Qvist, Per Olov & von Bagh, Peter. Guide to the Cinema of Sweden and Finland. Greenwood Publishing Group, 2000.

External links 
 

1943 films
Swedish comedy films
1943 comedy films
1940s Swedish-language films
Films directed by Per-Axel Branner
1940s Swedish films